The Heavy Tank T30 was a World War II American tank project developed to counter new German tanks, such as Tiger I, Tiger II, and tank destroyers, such as the Jagdtiger, or Soviet heavy tanks, such as IS-1 or IS-2. The T30 was designed at the same time as the T29 Heavy Tank.

Early tanks

Plans for four pilot heavy tanks were put forward in 1944; two T29 with a 105 mm gun and two T30 with a 155 mm gun.

The T30 pilot models were started in April 1945 and were delivered in 1947.

Apart from modifications to fit the different engine, the chassis was the same as the T29. The  gun fired separate loading (shell and charge) ammunition. The loader was assisted by a spring rammer. The T30 was fitted with one of the largest guns ever used on an American tank. The high, rounded edge, turret was needed to accommodate the standing loader and large gun mount. Even then the gun could only be loaded at limited elevations. It could carry a mixed assortment of 34 T35E1 HVAP (high-velocity armor piercing), M112B1 and T29E1 APCBC-HE (armor-piercing capped ballistic cap high-explosive) M107 HE (high explosive), or M110 WP (Smoke) rounds.

Variants
One pilot model, designated T30E1, had a semi-automatic system added to assist the loader in ramming the ammunition into the breech. This brought the gun breech into position, rammed the round from the loading tray into the breech and then returned the gun to the initial angle. An additional hatch at the back of the turret was added for the automatic ejection of the empty shell casings.

Survivors 

There are surviving examples in Fort Benning, Georgia. One surviving T30 is at the Detroit Arsenal in Warren, MI. Another is at Fort Jackson, South Carolina.

References

Sources
 

Heavy tanks of the United States
World War II tanks of the United States
Abandoned military projects of the United States
History of the tank
Trial and research tanks of the United States